is a Japanese football player.

Career

Nara Club
Suzuki signed a one-year deal with Nara Club in January 2018, but left the club again at the end of the season, when his contract expired.

Club statistics
Updated to 23 February 2018.

References

External links
Profile at Nara Club

1993 births
Living people
Chukyo University alumni
Association football people from Aichi Prefecture
Japanese footballers
J2 League players
Japan Football League players
FC Gifu players
Nara Club players
Association football defenders